The NWA Southern Junior Heavyweight Championship is a professional wrestling title for lighter wrestlers, board-controlled by the National Wrestling Alliance since December 1949.

It originally was used by various promotions across the Southeastern United States, most prevalently in NWA Mid-America based Tennessee. In August 1974, it was renamed the NWA Southern Heavyweight Championship (Memphis version).

The title was revived by the NWA in December 1999, and is used in the NWA Mid-South promotion, based in Humboldt, Tennessee.

Title history

See also
Continental Wrestling Association
National Wrestling Alliance

References

Junior heavyweight wrestling championships
National Wrestling Alliance championships
NWA Mid-America championships
Regional professional wrestling championships